Gone West (March 10, 1984 – September 7, 2009) was an American Thoroughbred racehorse. Bred by William O. Reed, he was a son of the influential sire Mr. Prospector. His dam, Secrettame, was a daughter of 1973 U.S. Triple Crown winner Secretariat.

Purchased by Alice du Pont Mills and raced under her Hickory Tree Stable banner, Gone West was conditioned for racing by U.S. Racing Hall of Fame trainer Woody Stephens. While Gone West won three important stakes races, he is best known as a sire and a sire of sires. At stud, among the notable horses he sired are:
 West by West (1989-2011) - multiple stakes winner with career earnings of $1,038,123
 Zafonic (1990-2002) - won British Classic 2,000 Guineas Stakes European Champion Two-Year-Old Colt
 Lassigny (b. 1991) - won G1 Rothman's International (1995), career earnings $1,318,371
 Da Hoss (b. 1992) - won Breeders' Cup Mile (1996, 1998), career earnings $1,931,558
 Elusive Quality (1993-2018) - stakes winner, sired Smarty Jones, Raven's Pass, Quality Road
 Commendable (1997-2014) -  won Belmont Stakes (2000)
 Speightstown (b. 1998) -  won Breeders' Cup Sprint (2004), American Champion Sprint Horse (2004), career earnings $1,258,256
 Came Home (1999-2021) - multiple Grade 1 winner, career earnings $1,835,940
 Johar (1999-2014) - won G1 Hollywood Derby (2002), G1  Breeders' Cup Turf (2003); career earnings $1,494,496
 Marsh Side (b. 2003) - won G1 Canadian International, career earnings $1,519,706

Other sons of Gone West who became good sires were Zamindar, Mr. Greeley, Proud Citizen, Grand Slam, and Western Winter. Gone West is the damsire of 2005 Epsom Derby winner, Motivator.

Gone West stood at Mill Ridge Farm in Lexington, Kentucky. They announced that the stallion would be pensioned after the 2009 breeding season. However, he was euthanized due to complications from colic.

References

 Gone West's pedigree and partial racing stats
 Gone West at Mill Ridge Farm

1984 racehorse births
2009 racehorse deaths
Racehorses bred in Kentucky
Racehorses trained in the United States
Thoroughbred family 2-f
Chefs-de-Race